Tassaduq Hussain Mufti   is an ace  cinematographer known for his films Omkara (2006 film) and Kaminey. He is also the member of Jammu and Kashmir Peoples Democratic Party and the former member of Jammu and Kashmir Legislative Council. He served as the cabinet minister for tourism from 2017 to 2018 in the government of Jammu and Kashmir. He is the son of former Home Minister of India and two time Chief Minister of Jammu and Kashmir  Mufti Mohammad Sayeed and brother of former chief minister of Jammu and Kashmir, Mehbooba Mufti.

References

1973 births
Living people
People from Anantnag
Jammu and Kashmir Peoples Democratic Party politicians
People from Bijbehara
Kashmiri people
21st-century Indian politicians
Members of the Jammu and Kashmir Legislative Council